Association football is the most popular sport in Denmark, with 331,693 players and 1,647 clubs registered under the Danish FA. The game was introduced into Denmark by British sailors. Kjøbenhavns Boldklub is the oldest club outside of the United Kingdom, having been founded on 26 April 1876.

Denmark hosted the 1984 European Competition for Women's Football, the 1991 UEFA Women's Euro, the 2000 UEFA Cup Final, and the 2003 UEFA Women's Cup Final.

Men's league system

The Copenhagen Football Championship, known as Fodboldturneringen, was established in 1889 as the first domestic league by the Danish Football Association (DBU). Since its founding, many other regional leagues was founded in Denmark. A national league championship was first established in 1927 with the first season being held as 1927–28 Danmarksmesterskabsturneringen. The different leagues was linked together to create a pyramidal structure allowing promotion and relegation between different levels.

The top four levels in Denmark are governed by the Danish Football Association and, the first three divisions by its professional body Divisionsforeningen. The top 3 are collectively called Danmarksturneringen i fodbold (literally: the Denmark Tournament in Football), and share a common set of rules more geared towards professional football. Reserve teams are allowed in the league structure, but can only reach the Denmark Series. The Danish Superliga clubs' reserve teams, primarily, have their own reserve competition.

The lower divisions are controlled by the six regional associations. The number of divisions in the lower series under the auspices of the local football association vary greatly depending on the association's size.

Competition records

UEFA Champions League
The following teams have advanced to elimination rounds in the UEFA Champions League.
Group stage: Aalborg BK (1995–96, 2008–09), Brøndby IF (1998–99), F.C. Copenhagen (2006–07, 2010–11, 2013–14, 2016–17), Nordsjælland (2012–13), F.C. Midtjylland (2020–21)
Round of 16: Copenhagen (2010–11)

UEFA Cup/Europa League
The following teams have advanced to elimination rounds in the UEFA Cup (now Europa League).
Semi-finals: Brøndby IF (1990–91)
Quarter-finals: Boldklubben 1903 (1991–92), Odense BK (1994–95), Brøndby IF (1996–97), Copenhagen (2019–20)
Round of 16: Aalborg BK (2008–09)

UEFA Europa Conference League
The following teams have advanced to elimination rounds in the UEFA Europa Conference League.
Round of 16: Copenhagen (2021–22)
Knock out round: Midtjylland (2021–22), Randers (2021–22)

Defunct:

European Cup
The following teams have advanced to elimination rounds in the European Cup.
Quarter-finals: AGF Aarhus (1960–61), Brøndby IF (1986–87)

UEFA Cup Winners' Cup 
The following teams have advanced to elimination rounds in the UEFA Cup Winners' Cup.
Quarter-finals: B1909 (1962–63), Randers Freja (1968–69), Vejle BK (1977–78), AGF Aarhus (1988–89)

See also
List of football clubs in Denmark
List of football stadiums in Denmark
Roligan

References

External links
 Danish Football Association
 Jutland Football History
 Peders fodboldstatistik, extensive match database
 www.haslund.info, season by season results and tables
 League321.com - Danish Football League Tables, Records & Statistics Database.